Ngata Prosser Pitcaithly (26 September 1906 – 28 April 1991) was a New Zealand principal and educationalist. He was born in Waimate, South Canterbury, New Zealand in 1906. Not from Māori-ancestry, his Australian-born mother liked Māori names and all the children were given one. Pitcaithly did develop an interest in Māori culture and made outstanding contributions to Māori education. He died at Auckland in 1991.

References

1906 births
1991 deaths
People educated at Nelson College
People from Waimate
New Zealand schoolteachers